Helga Arendt (24 April 1964 – 11 March 2013) was a West German sprinter who competed mainly in the 400 metres.

Biography
Arendt was born in Cologne, North Rhine-Westphalia.  In 1987 she finished fourth at the 1987 European Indoor Championships, only 0.01 second behind bronze medalist Cristina Pérez. Later that year she competed at the 1987 World Championships. In the 4 x 400 metres relay she finished fifth with teammates Ute Thimm, Gudrun Abt and Gisela Kinzel. She also competed in the individual 400 metres distance, but did not reach the final round of competition.

On 20 February the next year Arendt helped set a world indoor record of 1:32.55 minutes in the 4 x 200 metres relay, with Silke Knoll, Mechthild Kluth and Gisela Kinzel of the sports club SC Eintracht Hamm. At the 1988 European Indoor Championships she won a silver medal in the 400 metres, placing between East Germans Petra Müller and Dagmar Neubauer. At the 1988 Olympic Games she finished seventh in the 400 metres and fourth in the 4 × 400 m relay, with Ute Thimm, Andrea Thomas and Gudrun Abt.

In 1989 came the highlight of Arendt's career as she won the gold medal at the World Indoor Championships. She finished ahead of American Diane Dixon, who had finished fifth at the Olympics, with a margin of 0.25 seconds. At the 1990 European Championships, however, Arendt was again knocked out before the final round of the 400 metres competition, only reaching the semi-final. She finished fourth in the 4 x 400 metres relay with teammates Karin Janke, Andrea Thomas and Silke Knoll.

Arendt represented the sports clubs Pulheimer SC, ASV Köln, SC Eintracht Hamm and LG Olympia Dortmund during her active career. She became West German champion in 1988 and 1989, as well as West German indoor champion in 1987, 1988 and 1989. Her personal best times were 23.13 in the 200 metres, achieved in July 1988 in Frankfurt am Main, and 50.36 in the 400 metres, achieved in the 1988 Olympic semi-final in Seoul.

Arendt was 1.78 metres tall; during her active career she weighed 66 kilograms.

References

External links

1964 births
2013 deaths
Athletes from Cologne
West German female sprinters
Athletes (track and field) at the 1988 Summer Olympics
Olympic athletes of West Germany
ASV Köln athletes
SC Eintracht Hamm athletes
LG Olympia Dortmund athletes
World Athletics Championships athletes for West Germany
Universiade medalists in athletics (track and field)
Universiade silver medalists for West Germany
World Athletics Indoor Championships winners
Medalists at the 1989 Summer Universiade
Olympic female sprinters